Jane Caroline Sowden is a British biologist who is Professor of Developmental Biology and Genetics at the Great Ormond Street Hospital for Children NHS Foundation Trust. Her research investigates eye formation and repair by developing a better understanding the genetic pathways that regulate eye development.

Early life and education 
Sowden was an undergraduate in biochemistry at the University of Oxford. She moved to University College London for her doctorate where she studied the carbonic anhydrase I gene.

Research and career 
After her PhD, Sowden moved to the Medical Research Council (MRC) human biochemical genetics unit. She was awarded a career development award in 1996, and spent four years working on retinal development at the Institute of Ophthalmology. Sowden established the eye development and repair research group at Great Ormond Street Hospital.  She looks to understand the genetic pathways that underpin eye development. She is interested in how these pathways are disrupted in patients with eye disease. To explore these pathways, Sowden uses DNA sampling. Childhood blindness can involve structural malformations, which occur due do disruption of biological processes. The eye globe develops before birth from the embryonic optic cup. Mutations of the CHX10 gene can cause non-syndromic microphthalmia. By studying mice with CHX10 mutations Sowden looks to identify the molecular pathways that regulate relevant retinal progenitor cells. These cells undergo a number of cell divisions before producing all retinal neurons. Sowden has explored whether stem cells can be used to repair diseased retinal neurons during retinal diseases such as retinitis pigmentosa. She has explored whether the ciliary epithelium can be used to generate progenitor cells for photoreceptors. She has shown that the developing retina contains a population of rod photoreceptor precursor cells, which can be transplanted into a diseased retina to restore vision.

Her former doctoral students include Adam Rutherford.

Selected publications 
Her publications include:

 Restoration of vision after transplantation of photoreceptors
 Retinal repair by transplantation of photoreceptor precursors
 Fox's in development and disease
 Photoreceptor precursors derived from three-dimensional embryonic stem cell cultures integrate and mature within adult degenerate retina

References 

Living people
Alumni of University College London
Alumni of the University of Oxford
Academics of the University of Oxford
21st-century British biologists
British women scientists
Year of birth missing (living people)